Bishop Edward Kawa, O.F.M. Conv. (born 17 April 1978) is a Ukrainian Roman Catholic prelate as the Titular Bishop of Cilibia and Auxiliary bishop of Archdiocese of Lviv since 13 May 2017.

Life
Bishop Kawa was born in the Polish family of Stanisław and Kazimiera (née Dorosz) Kawa in the Western Ukraine. After graduation of the school education, joined the Order of Friars Minor Conventual in 1995; he made a profession on September 28, 1997 and a solemn profession on December 15, 2001, and was ordained as priest on June 1, 2003, after graduation of the Major Franciscan Theological Seminary in Kraków, Poland and Major Theological Seminary of Mary – the Queen of Apostles in Saint Petersburg, Russian Federation.

He returned to Ukraine in 2003 and began to work in the Franciscan parishes and as superior of the different local Franciscan communities. During 2016–2017 he served as a Guardian of the convent of the parish of St. Antony in Lviv.

On May 13, 2017, he was appointed by the Pope Francis as the second Auxiliary Bishop of the Archdiocese of Lviv, Ukraine and Titular Bishop of Cilibia. On June 21, 2017, he was consecrated as bishop by Metropolitan Archbishop Mieczysław Mokrzycki and other prelates of the Roman Catholic Church.

References

See also

1978 births
Living people
People from Mostyska
Conventual Friars Minor
Conventual Franciscan bishops
Ukrainian people of Polish descent
21st-century Roman Catholic bishops in Ukraine